Šugman is a surname. Notable people with the surname include:

Jernej Šugman (1968–2017), Slovene actor
Zlatko Šugman (1932–2008), Slovene actor

See also
Tugman